Events in the year 2022 in El Salvador.

Incumbents 

 President: Nayib Bukele
 Vice President: Félix Ulloa

Events 
Ongoing — COVID-19 pandemic in El Salvador

 27 March – El Salvador declares a state of emergency after 62 people were murdered in the country yesterday, making it the most violent 24-hour period since the end of the civil war in 1992.
 16 April – President of El Salvador Nayib Bukele announces that 12,169 gang members have been arrested since the state of emergency began on March 27.
 4 July – El Salvador suspends classes as Hurricane Bonnie passes through Central America. Deaths have been reported in Nicaragua and El Salvador.
 15 September – Bukele announces that he intends to run for reelection in the 2024 Salvadoran general election.
 22 September – Seven people are killed by landslides in El Salvador.

Scheduled events

Holidays 

 10 April – 16 April — Holy Week
 10 May – Mother's Day
 17 June – Father's Day
 4–6 August — August Festivals, including Feast of San Salvador
 15 September – Independence Day, anniversary of the Act of Independence of Central America.
 2 November – Day of the Dead

Sports 

 July - December: 2022–23 Primera División de El Salvador

Deaths 

 29 May – Yanci Urbina, 58, politician.
 14 June – Rodrigo Orlando Cabrera Cuéllar, 84, Roman Catholic prelate.
 21 July – Gustavo López Davidson, 60–61, politician.

References

External links 

 

 
2020s in El Salvador
Years of the 21st century in El Salvador
El Salvador
El Salvador